Shane Edward Gates (born 27 September 1992) is a South African-born Japanese professional rugby union player, currently playing in the Japanese Top League with NTT Communications Shining Arcs. His usual position is fly-half or inside centre.

Career

Youth

He represented them at the Under-18 Craven Week competition in 2010 and also played for the  side in the 2010 Under-19 Provincial Championship. He represented the  side in the 2011, 2012 and 2013 competitions, helping them reach the Division B final on all three occasions and winning the title in 2012 and 2013.

Eastern Province Kings / Southern Kings

His senior debut came during the 2012 Vodacom Cup competition against Argentinean invitational side  in Stellenbosch; he started the match and also marked the occasion by scoring his first try, dotting down shortly before half-time. He made a further three starts and one substitute's appearance during the competition.

Despite scoring a try, he could not help the Kings crashing to a 53–14 defeat and ultimately failing to win promotion.

Gates was named in the  wider training squad for the 2013 Super Rugby season, but was subsequently released to the Vodacom Cup squad.

However, he was not included in their final squad and returned to the Kings. He wasn't involved in the 2014 Vodacom Cup competition, instead training with the Kings' Currie Cup group prior to the 2014 Currie Cup Premier Division season. In June 2014, he was selected in the starting line-up for the  side to face  during a tour match during a 2014 incoming tour. He played the first 72 minutes of the match as the Kings suffered a 12–34 defeat.

In May 2015, Gates captained the side for the first time in a friendly encounter against the Golden Lions. With the Kings returning to Super Rugby in 2016 season, Gates was named vice-captain for the season. He captained the Kings for first time against the Cheetahs in May following an injury to regular captain Steven Sykes.

NTT Shining Arcs

In June 2016, it was announced that Gates would join Japanese Top League side NTT Communications Shining Arcs on a two-year deal following the 2016 Super Rugby season.

Representative rugby

In 2011, Gates was included in a South African Kings squad that participated in the 2011 IRB Nations Cup in Romania.

References

Rugby union players from Port Elizabeth
South African rugby union players
Eastern Province Elephants players
Southern Kings players
South African people of British descent
Living people
1992 births
Rugby union fly-halves
Rugby union centres
Urayasu D-Rocks players
South African expatriate rugby union players
Expatriate rugby union players in Japan
South African expatriate sportspeople in Japan
Sunwolves players
Japan international rugby union players